Iridopsis dataria is a species of geometrid moth in the family Geometridae.

The MONA or Hodges number for Iridopsis dataria is 6573.

References

Further reading

 

Boarmiini
Articles created by Qbugbot
Moths described in 1882